The Forward-class cruisers were a pair of scout cruisers built for the Royal Navy in the first decade of the 20th century. The sister ships spent much of the first decade of their careers in reserve. The latter ship was in Hartlepool when the German bombarded it in December, but never fired a shot. The ships were transferred to the Mediterranean in 1915 and then to the Aegean in mid-1916 where they remained until 1918. They survived the war, but were scrapped shortly afterwards.

Background and description
In 1901–1902, the Admiralty developed scout cruisers to work with destroyer flotillas, leading their torpedo attacks and backing them up when attacked by other destroyers. It accepted four of the submissions and ordered one ship from each builder in the 1902–1903 Naval Programme and a repeat in the following year's programme.

The two ships from Fairfield Shipbuilding and Engineering Company became the Forward class. Four more 12-pounders were added to the specification in August. Their crew consisted of 289 officers and ratings.

The Forward-class ships were powered by a pair of three-cylinder triple-expansion steam engines, each driving one shaft, using steam provided by a dozen Thornycroft boilers that exhausted into three funnels. The sisters slightly exceeded their design speed when they ran their sea trials in 1905. The scout cruisers soon proved too slow for this role as newer destroyers outpaced them.

The main armament of the Forward class consisted of ten QF 12-pounder 18-cwt guns. Three guns were mounted abreast on the forecastle and the quarterdeck, with the remaining four guns positioned port and starboard amidships. They also carried eight QF 3-pounder Hotchkiss guns and two single mounts for 18-inch torpedo tubes, one on each broadside.

Ships

Service history
The sisters were in reserve for most of the first decade of their existence. After the beginning of the First World War in August 1914, Foresight was initially assigned to the Dover Patrol and was then transferred to a destroyer flotilla patrolling the English Channel. Forward was assigned to coastal defence duties on the East Coast of England; she was present when the Germans bombarded Hartlepool in mid-December 1914, but played no significant role in the battle. The sisters were sent to the Mediterranean in 1915 and were then assigned to the Aegean Sea a year later and remained there until the end of the war. After returning home in 1919, they were paid off and broken up in 1920–1921.

Notes

Footnotes

Bibliography

External links

Forward class in World War I
History of the Forward class

 
Cruiser classes
Ship classes of the Royal Navy